Members of the 16th Lok Sabha were elected during the 2014 Indian general election. The elections were conducted in 9 phases from 7 April 2014 to 12 May 2014 by the Election Commission of India. The results of the election were declared on 16 May 2014. 
 
The Bharatiya Janata Party (of the NDA) achieved an absolute majority with 282 seats out of 543, 166 seats more than in the previous 15th Lok Sabha. Its PM candidate Narendra Modi took office on 26 May 2014 as the 14th prime minister of India. The first session was convened from 4 to 11 June 2014.

There was no leader of the opposition in the 16th Lok Sabha as the Indian Parliament rules state that a party in the Lok Sabha must have at least 10% (55) of the total seats (545) to be considered the opposition party. The Indian National Congress (of the UPA) could only manage 44 seats, while the All India Anna Dravida Munnetra Kazhagam party from Tamil Nadu came a close third with 37 seats. Mallikarjun Kharge was declared the leader of the Indian National Congress in the Lok Sabha.

Five sitting members from Rajya Sabha, the Upper House of Indian Parliament, were elected to 16th Lok Sabha after the 2014 Indian general election.

The pro-tem Speaker Kamal Nath was administered oath on 4 June 2014 & presided over the election of the Speaker of the Lok Sabha. Sumitra Mahajan was elected as its Speaker on 6 June 2014 and would remain in office until the day before the first sitting of the 17th Lok Sabha. M Thambidurai was elected as Deputy Speaker on 13 August 2014.

Members

 Speaker: Sumitra Mahajan, BJP
 Deputy Speaker: M. Thambidurai, AIADMK
 Secretary-General: Snehlata Shrivastava
 Leader of the House: Narendra Modi, BJP
 Leader of the Opposition: Vacant, as no opposition party received more than 10% of the total seats.

Party-wise Distribution of Seats
Following 36 political parties were represented in 16th Lok Sabha:

Criminal background

About one-third of all winners had at least one pending criminal case against them, with some having serious criminal cases.

* Criteria for "serious" criminal cases:
 Offence for which maximum punishment is of 5 years or more.
 If an offense is non-bailable.
 If it is an electoral offense (e.g. IPC 171E or bribery).
 Offence related to loss to the exchequer.
 Offences that are assault, murder, kidnap, rape-related.
 Offences that are mentioned in the Representation of the People Act (Section 8).
 Offences under the Prevention of Corruption Act.
 Crimes against women.

Compared to the 15th Lok Sabha, there was an increase of members with criminal cases. In 2009, 158 (30%) of the 521 members analyzed had criminal cases, of which 77 (15%) had serious criminal cases.

Financial background

Age
Age-wise distribution of the 542 members in the 16th Lok Sabha as of 16 May 2018'''

Membership by party 

No. of Lok Sabha MP's partywise : (As on 25 August 2021)

Bills
During the tenure of the 16th Lok Sabha, 21% of bills were referred to Parliamentary committees for examination

References

 List of Member of Parliament of 16th Lok Sabha

External links

 Live Election News & Updates  Lok Sabha (General) Election 2019 - Parliamentary Polls 2019 Latest News & Updates

 
Terms of the Lok Sabha
2014 establishments in India